Mimosa verrucosa, commonly known as jurema-branca ("white jurema") or jurema-de-oeiras, is a species of legume of the genus Mimosa, in the common bean family, Fabaceae.

It is a shrub or small tree native to Brazil (Bahia, Ceará, Paraíba, Pernambuco and Rio Grande do Norte). It has "near threatened" conservation status as a result of human‐caused deforestation in arid to semi-arid regions of Northeastern Brazil.

Growth
The tree grows to about 2.5 to 5 m tall and has blossoms that are pink cylindrical spikes.  The blossom filaments are pink and the anthers are cream colored.

Uses
The wood of the tree is used for making charcoal, firewood and wooden stakes.  The bark is used for medicine.

Characteristics

Mimosa verrucosa has been proven to be a very important provider of pollen for Apis mellifera, the European honey bee.

Chemical constituent
The tree contains the hallucinogen dimethyltryptamine in its root bark.

See also
Mimosa tenuiflora
Psychedelic plants

References

External links

Flora of Brazil
Forages
Medicinal plants
verrucosa
Near threatened plants
Taxonomy articles created by Polbot